Elections to Brentwood Council were held on 7 May 1998.  One third of the council was up for election and the Liberal Democrat party kept overall control of the council.

After the election, the composition of the council was
Liberal Democrat 25
Conservative 11
Labour 2
Liberal 1

Election result

Ward results

Brentwood North

Brentwood South

Brentwood West

Brizes & Doddinghurst

Hutton East

Hutton North

Hutton South

Ingatestone & Fryerning

Pilgrims Hatch

Shenfield

South Weald

Warley

West Horndon

References

"Council poll results", The Guardian 9 May 1998 page 16

1998
1998 English local elections
1990s in Essex